The 2013 FIG World Cup circuit in Rhythmic Gymnastics includes one category A event (Sofia) and seven category B events. Apart from Tartu, Bucharest and Corbeil-Essonnes (individuals only), all events include both individual and group competitions, with all-around competitions serving as qualifications for the finals by apparatus. With stopovers in Europe only, the competitions took place on 8 – 10 February in Tartu (EST), 3 – 6 April in Lisbon (POR), 19 – 21 April April in Bucharest (ROU), 26 – 28 April in Pesaro (ITA), 4 – 5 May in Sofia (BUL), 10 – 12 May in Corbeil-Essonnes (FRA), 17 – 19 May in Minsk (BLR) and 17 – 18 August in St Petersburg (RUS). The world ranking points collected by the competitors at their best four World Cup events added up to a total, and the top scorers in each event were crowned winners of the overall series at the final event in Saint Petersburg, Russia.

Formats

Medal winners

All-around

Individual

Group all-around

Apparatus

Hoop

Ball

Clubs

Ribbon

10 clubs

2 ribbons and 3 balls

Overall medal table

See also
 2013 FIG Artistic Gymnastics World Cup series

References

2013
Rhythmic Gymnastics World Cup